Germaine M. Buck Louis is the Dean of the George Mason University College of Health and Human Services, a professor in Mason’s Department of Global and Community Health, and a reproductive and perinatal epidemiologist.  Prior to her appointment as dean at George Mason in 2017, she was the founding Director for the Division of Intramural Population Health Research at the Eunice Kennedy Shriver National Institute of Child Health and Human Development.

Education 
Buck Louis earned her BA in medical sociology, and her MS and PhD in epidemiology at the State University of New York at Buffalo.

Academics 
Buck Louis started at Mason in 2017 as a professor and Dean of the George Mason University College of Health and Human Services, simultaneously.

Her research focuses on the impact of environmental influences, particularly endocrine disruptors and lifestyle, on human fecundity and fertility. Previously, she was a tenured professor in the Department of Social and Preventive Medicine at University of Buffalo, School of Medicine and Biomedical Sciences. She taught both graduate and medical school classes. Buck Louis was elected president of the Society for Pediatric and Perinatal Epidemiologic Research while on faculty at University of Buffalo.

Nursing and research 
Buck Louis trained and worked as a registered nurse at Millard Fillmore Hospital.

In 2000, she became a Senior Investigator and Chief of the Epidemiology Branch at the Eunice Kennedy Shriver National Institute of Child Health and Human Development (NICHD).  She went on to become the founding Director for the Division of Intramural Population Health Research at the NICHD and principal investigator for the LIFE Study, ENDO Study and NICHD Fetal Growth Studies before joining Mason.

Buck Louis currently serves on the Board on Environmental Studies and Toxicology, National Academies of Sciences, Engineering and Medicine, and on the Board for the American College of Epidemiology.

Selected works 
Buck Louis co-edited the textbook Reproductive and Perinatal Epidemiology. She has also published a number of scientific papers and technical reports.  A few publications include:

References 

American women epidemiologists
American epidemiologists
American university and college faculty deans
George Mason University faculty
Living people
Year of birth missing (living people)
21st-century American women
University at Buffalo alumni
American medical academics